James Thornton (December 5, 1861 – July 27, 1938) was an Irish-American songwriter and vaudeville performer. He is primarily remembered today as the composer of the 1898 song, "When You Were Sweet Sixteen".

Career
Thornton started his career as a "singing waiter" in Boston, Massachusetts, United States, and then achieved success with his wife, Elisabeth "Bonnie" Cox, in music halls throughout the US as what was then called a "serio-comic" or "monologist" (essentially a stand-up comic) and singer. During his career, he also performed in a vaudeville team with Charles B. Lawlor.

Thornton's compositions included: "When You Were Sweet Sixteen", "She May Have Seen Better Days", "The Irish Jubilee", "Two Little Girls in Blue", "When Summer Comes Around", "It Don't Seem Like the Same Old Smile", "My Sweetheart's the Man in the Moon", "Going for a Pardon", and "The Streets of Cairo".

Thornton's last public appearance was in 1934 at the Forrest Theater in New York City.

Private life
Little is known about his early life. According to the New York Times, he was born in Dublin, Ireland. According to the 1900 US census and his birth certificate, he was born of Irish parents, John Thornton and Catherine Molloy, in Liverpool, England.  He emigrated with his parents and siblings to Boston, United States in 1869, became a US citizen in 1931, and died in New York City.

Margaret Bradford Boni wrote about him:

Apparently, this was a recurring theme in their marriage, as a similar story is told about the origin of "When You Were Sweet Sixteen".

After Bonnie died in 1920, Thornton married restaurateur Josephine Boyle.

References

External links
 The New York Times obituary, published July 29, 1938

1861 births
1938 deaths
19th-century American male musicians
20th-century American male musicians
American male songwriters
American musical theatre composers
Vaudeville performers